Alexander Davion, (March 31, 1929 - September 28, 2019) French-born British actor. He was perhaps best known in the UK for his starring role in Gideon's Way as Detective Chief Inspector David Keen. He was born in Paris, France. He died in London, England at the age of 90.

Personal life 
He was married first to actress Ellen Caryl Klein (divorced) and to actress  in 1965.

Filmography

Film roles 
1951: Captain Horatio Hornblower - Spanish Officer (uncredited)
1954: The Good Die Young - Young Man (uncredited)
1955: Richard III - Messenger to Richard
1960: Song Without End - Chopin
1963: Paranoiac - Tony Ashby
1964: Blind Corner - Ricky
1964: Rattle of a Simple Man - Ricardo
1966: Plague of the Zombies - Harry Denver
1966: Thunderbirds Are GO - Space Captain Greg Martin (voice)
1967: Valley of the Dolls - Ted Casablanca
1969: The Royal Hunt of the Sun - De Nizza
1971: Incense for the Damned - Tony Seymour
1971: Clinic Exclusive - Lee Maitland
1973: Charley-One-Eye - Tony (uncredited)
1977: Dark Echoes - Dereck Stanhope
1986: Whoops Apocalypse  - Maguadoran General

Television roles 
1959: Perry Mason (Episode: "The Case of the Wayward Wife") - Gilbert Ames
1962: Combat! (Episode: "Any Second Now", season 1, episode 4)
1964-1966: Gideon's Way (26 episodes) - David Keen
1966: The Man Who Never Was - Roger Barry
1967: Custer - Capt Marcus A Reno
1970: UFO (Episode: The Psychobombs) - the executive
1977: Van der Valk (Episode: Diane) - as a man who is murdered at the start of the episode
1982: The Professionals (Episode: Operation Susie) - Torres
1984: Arch of Triumph (TV Movie) - Alex

References

External links

1929 births
2019 deaths
British male film actors
British male television actors
French male film actors
French male television actors